Acalolepta persimilis is a species of beetle in the family Cerambycidae. It was described by Charles Joseph Gahan in 1907. It is known from the Nicobar and Andaman Islands, and Sumatra.

References

Acalolepta
Beetles described in 1907